Jennifer Owens (born 1 June 1963) is an Australian former cricketer who played as a right-arm off break and leg break bowler. She appeared in three Test matches and three One Day Internationals for Australia in 1987, and 12 One Day Internationals for International XI at the 1982 World Cup. She played domestic cricket for Western Australia.

References

External links
 
 
 Jenny Owens at southernstars.org.au

Living people
1963 births
Cricketers from Perth, Western Australia
Australia women Test cricketers
Australia women One Day International cricketers
International XI women One Day International cricketers
Western Australia women cricketers